Cassigerinella is an extinct genus of foraminifera belonging to the family Cassigerinellidae of the superfamily Guembelitrioidea and the suborder Globigerinina. Its type species is Cassigerinella chipolensis.

Species
Species in Cassigerinella include:
 Cassigerinella chipolensis
 Cassigerinella eocaenica
 Cassigerinella martinezpicoi
 Cassigerinella regularis
 Cassigerinella spinata

References

Foraminifera genera
Globigerinina